Hasanabad-e Yek (also Romanized as Ḩasanābād-e Yek; also known as Ḩasanābād and Ḩasanābād-e Qomastān) is a village in Saadatabad Rural District, Pariz District, Sirjan County, Kerman Province, Iran. At the 2006 census, its population was 212, in 47 families.

References 

Populated places in Sirjan County